Special operations unit may refer to special forces in general.

Special Operations Unit may also refer to:
 Boston Police Special Operations Unit
 Special Operations Unit (Serbia), a former police unit of the State Security Service
 Special Operations Unit (North Macedonia), a Macedonian police unit
 Unidad de Operaciones Especiales, a former unit of the Spanish Navy and Marines

See also 
 List of special operations units
 Special Operations Group (disambiguation)